Hemiptocha atratellus is a moth in the family Crambidae. It was described by George Hampson in 1919. It is found in Paraná, Brazil.

References

Chiloini
Moths described in 1919